José Joaquim Domingos Ramos (born 28 July 1968 in Barreira) is a Portuguese long-distance runner.

Achievements

References 
 

1968 births
Living people
Portuguese male long-distance runners
Olympic athletes of Portugal
Athletes (track and field) at the 1996 Summer Olympics
Athletes (track and field) at the 2000 Summer Olympics